Eric Assad Bakhtiari (born December 2, 1984) is a former American football linebacker. He was most recently playing for the San Francisco 49ers, but was cut from the team on January 1, 2013. He was signed by the San Diego Chargers as an undrafted free agent in 2008. He played college football at San Diego.

Bakhtiari was also a member of the Tampa Bay Buccaneers, Tennessee Titans, Miami Dolphins, and Kansas City Chiefs. He is the older brother of Green Bay Packers tackle David Bakhtiari.

College career
In 2006, he earned 3rd Team Associated Press All-America honors for all I-AA players, 1st Team Mid-Major All-American (The Sports Network), 2006 co-Pioneer Football League Defender of the Year, First-team All-Pioneer Football League. Making him a key performer of the USD defensive squad that ranked #2 in scoring defense (12.9 ppg), 10th in rushing defense (107.3 yards per game) and 12th in total defense.

Professional career

First stint with Chargers
Bakhtiari signed with the San Diego Chargers as an undrafted free agent in 2008. He was released by the Chargers on August 30 during final cuts, but re-signed to the practice squad on September 10 when linebacker Shawne Merriman was placed on injured reserve. He was released again on September 23.

San Francisco 49ers
Bakhtiari was signed to the practice squad of the San Francisco 49ers on October 7. He remained there through the end of the season.

Second stint with Chargers
After finishing the 2008 season on the practice squad of the 49ers, Bakhtiari was re-signed to a future contract by the San Diego Chargers on January 7, 2009.

Tennessee Titans
Bakhtiari was signed to the Tennessee Titans' practice squad on November 11, 2009. He was signed off the practice squad to active roster on December 12. He was released by the Titans on September 4, 2010.

Kansas City Chiefs
Bakhtiari was signed to the Kansas City Chiefs' practice squad on November 18, 2010. On December 3, he was released. On January 13, 2011, he signed with the Chiefs again; on August 29, however, he was waived/injured during the first round of preseason cuts and after passing through waivers unclaimed, was subsequently placed on injured reserve. After reaching an injury settlement, Bakhtiari was released. Despite being on their roster for the 2010 season, he never played in a game during his tenure with the Chiefs.

Second stint with 49ers
Bakhtiari was re-signed by the 49ers during the 2012 preseason. He played in the preseason as a backup to compete on the 53-man roster. After the end of the 2012 preseason, Bakhtiari was cut on August 31, 2012, with 27 other players. However, the 49ers later decided to sign him to a two-year contract.

After releasing him earlier in the year, the 49ers re-signed Bakhtiari on December 12, 2012. On January 1, 2013, Bakhtiari was released by the 49ers to create a roster spot for kicker Billy Cundiff. Cundiff was signed to compete with struggling incumbent kicker David Akers.

Personal life
Bakhtiari is of Iranian and Icelandic descent. His younger brother David is an offensive tackle, who played at Colorado (2009–2012), and now plays for the Green Bay Packers.

References

External links
San Francisco 49ers bio
San Diego Toreros bio

1984 births
Living people
American people of Icelandic descent
American people of Iranian descent
Players of American football from California
American football defensive ends
American football linebackers
San Diego Toreros football players
San Diego Chargers players
San Francisco 49ers players
Tampa Bay Buccaneers players
Tennessee Titans players
Miami Dolphins players
Kansas City Chiefs players
People from San Mateo, California
Sportspeople of Iranian descent
Bakhtiari people